The 2017–18 season was Al-Ettifaq's 73rd season in existence and their second consecutive in the Pro League. Along with the Pro League, the club also competed in the King Cup. 

The season covered the period from 1 July 2017 to 30 June 2018.

Players

Squad information

Out on loan

Transfers

In

Summer

Winter

Out

Summer

Winter

Loan in

Summer

Winter

Loan out

Summer

Winter

Pre-season friendlies

Competitions

Overall

Last Updated: 12 April 2018

Pro League

League table

Results summary

Results by round

Matches
All times are local, AST (UTC+3).

King Cup
Al-Ettifaq will enter the King Cup in the Round of 32 alongside the other Pro League teams. All times are local, AST (UTC+3).

Crown Prince Cup
Al-Ettifaq will enter the Crown Prince Cup in the Round of 16 alongside the other Pro League teams. On 19 September 2017, it was announced that the tournament was cancelled.

Statistics

Appearances
As of 12 April 2018.

|-
!colspan="14"|Players who left during the season

|}

Goalscorers

Last Updated: 12 April 2018

Clean sheets

Last Updated: 6 March 2018

References

Ettifaq FC seasons
Ettifaq